Akberdino (Aqbirźe) is a rural locality (a selo) and the administrative centre of Akberdinsky Selsoviet, Iglinsky District, Bashkortostan, Russia. The population was 1,009 as of 2010. There are 67 streets.

Geography 
Akberdino is located 45 km southwest of Iglino (the district's administrative centre) by road. Blokhino is the nearest rural locality.

References 

Rural localities in Iglinsky District